Bente Elin Lilleøkseth (born 25 September 1974) is a Norwegian politician for the Labour Party.

She served as a deputy representative to the Norwegian Parliament from Hedmark during the term 2001–2005.

On the local level, Lilleøkseth is the mayor of Løten since 2007. She was first elected to the municipality council in 1999.

References

1974 births
Living people
Deputy members of the Storting
Labour Party (Norway) politicians
Mayors of places in Hedmark
Women mayors of places in Norway
20th-century Norwegian women politicians
20th-century Norwegian politicians
Women members of the Storting